Kalyan Chaubey (born 16 December 1976) is an Indian politician of Bhartiya Janta Party and a former professional football goalkeeper. He is the current president of the All India Football Federation.

Family
Chaubey is from Kolkata, West Bengal. His younger sister Bulbuli Panja is a Bengali television actress. Chaubey married his wife Sohini in 2004. They have one daughter - Aishani.

Career

Playing career
Chaubey graduated from Tata Football Academy in 1995. He played as a goalkeeper and won the award – "Indian Goalkeeper of the Year" – in 1997–98 and 2001–02. He was member of the Indian teams at U-17 Asian Youth Championship 1994 in Iran and U-20 Asian Youth Championship 1996 in South Korea in 1996, the India national team from 1999 to 2006.

He was part of the Indian team that won the SAFF Championship twice. He played the National Championship (Santosh Trophy) for five different states of Jharkhand, West Bengal, Goa, Punjab and Maharashtra. He played for Mohun Bagan AC, East Bengal FC, Salgaocar SC, Mahindra United, JCT Phagwara, and Mumbai FC as a goalkeeper. He had a short loan spell at Bangladesh Muktiyodha, Dhaka. He also played for East Bengal and Mohun Bagan from 1996 to 2000. In 2002, he trialled for the German club 2. Bundesliga side Karlsruher SC, and Verbandsliga Württemberg outfit VfR Heilbronn.

Honours

India
SAFF Championship: 1999, 2005
 South Asian Games Bronze medal: 1999

Individual
Indian Goalkeeper of the Year: 1997–98, 2001–02

Administrative career
After his retirement as footballer, he had a brief modelling career. He was the CEO of Mohun Bagan academy from 2010 to 2013. He was also a co-ordinator for the GOALZ Project 2012, developed by Kolkata Police and British Council, to support underprivileged children.

On 2 September 2022, Chaubey was elected as the President of the All India Football Federation after his 33–1 victory over former India international Bhaichung Bhutia.

Political career
In 2015, he turned to politics and joined the Bhartiya Janata Party (BJP). He was nominated by the BJP as its candidate for the Krishnanagar (Lok Sabha constituency) the 2019 Indian general election but lost to Mahua Moitra of the Trinamool Congress (TMC).

External links
 Kalyan Chaubey at Goal.com (archived)
 Official website (archived)
 Official portal of Kalyan Chaubey

References

1976 births
Living people
Footballers from Kolkata
Indian footballers
India international footballers
India youth international footballers
Mohun Bagan AC players
East Bengal Club players
Salgaocar FC players
Bengal Mumbai FC players
JCT FC players
Mumbai FC players
Mahindra United FC players
Association football goalkeepers
West Bengal politicians
Bharatiya Janata Party politicians from West Bengal
South Asian Games medalists in football
South Asian Games bronze medalists for India
Indian sports executives and administrators
Indian football executives
Presidents of the All India Football Federation